In molecular biology, the protein domain SRCR is short for Scavenger receptor cysteine-rich domain. They are found solely in eukaryotes.
These domains are present on the cell membrane and have a role in binding to specific ligands and are often found to be involved with the immune system.

Function
The function of these endocytic receptors are to mediating non-opsonic phagocytosis in response to foreign ligands. This triggers various  processes of host defence and immune response.

Structure
The structure contains a  six stranded beta-sheet and one alpha-helix.

Examples
The  speract receptor  found in egg, is a transmembrane glycoprotein. Other members of this family include the macrophage scavenger receptor type I, an enteropeptidase, and T-cell surface glycoprotein CD5.

References

Protein domains